Blessed Antonio Francesco Davide Ambrogio Rosmini-Serbati (Rovereto, 25 March 1797Stresa, 1 July 1855) was an Italian Roman Catholic priest and philosopher. Alessandro Manzoni considered Rosmini the only contemporary Italian author worth reading.

Biography
Antonio Rosmini Serbati was born 24 March 1797, at Rovereto, in the Austrian Tyrol. He studied at the University of Padua, and was ordained priest at Chioggia, 21 April 1821. In 1822 he received a Doctorate in Theology and Canon Law.

During this time Rosmini formulated his "Principle of Passivity". Rosmini felt compelled to ask himself: Do my plans spring more from my own subjective desire to do good than from a desire to do the will of God?”. Reflecting in this way, Rosmini articulated the principle in two parts: be ready to undertake any work of charity but only so long as it is God's Providence that presents it; in the meantime, immerse oneself in the commitment to continual conversion, seeking the amendment of one's own life.

The Institute of Charity
In 1828 he founded at Monte Calvario near Domodossola, a new religious community, the Institute of Charity, known generally since as the Rosminians. In the autumn of 1830 he inaugurated the observance of the rule at Calvario, and from 1834 to 1835 had charge of a parish at Rovereto. Later foundations followed at Stresa and Domodossola. The Constitutions of the institute were approved by presented to Pope Gregory XVI on 20 December 1838. The institute spread rapidly in England and Italy, and requests for foundations came from various countries.

The members might be priests or laymen, who devoted themselves to preaching, the education of youth, and works of universal charity—material, spiritual and intellectual. They work in Italy, England, Ireland, France, Wales, New Zealand, Kenya, Tanzania, India, Venezuela, and the United States. In London they were attached to the historical Church of St Etheldreda, Ely Place, Holborn. In 1962, Rosmini College School for Boys was founded in Auckland, New Zealand by Father Catcheside.

Rosmini was retained as a political advisor to the then government of Piedmont. In August 1848, he was sent to Rome by King Charles Albert of Piedmont to enlist the pope on the side of Italy as against Austria. Rosmini was invited to serve in the Roman Curia of Pope Pius IX as prime minister of the Papal States. He participated in the intellectual struggle which had for its object emancipation from Austria, but as a trusted ecclesiastical advisor and diplomat he was not an initiator of the movement which ended in the freedom and unity of Italy. In fact, while eager for the deliverance of Italy from Austria, his aim was to bring about a confederation of the states of the country, which was to be under the control of the pope. Upon establishment of the Roman Republic, the Pontiff was forced to flee and became estranged from his former advisor in political matters. The tenuous political circumstances made it very difficult to reconcile the two men's differing projects: innovative social and juridical reforms, however modest, fell victim to the more pressing existential needs of defending the supremacy of the Church's temporal powers.

Writings
Rosmini's works, Of the five wounds of the Holy Church and The Constitution of Social Justice (see Works below), aroused great opposition, especially among the Jesuits, and in 1849 they were placed upon the Index. Rosmini at once declared his submission and retired to Stresa on Lago Maggiore, where he died. Before his death he had the satisfaction of learning that the works in question were dismissed, that is, proclaimed free from censure by the Congregation of the Index. Twenty years later, the word dismissed (dimittantur) became the subject of controversy, some maintaining that it amounted to a direct approval, others that it was purely negative and did not imply that the books were free from error. 
Vincenzo Maria Gatti, the Dominican professor of theology at the College of Saint Thomas, the forerunner of the Pontifical University of Saint Thomas Aquinas and Master of the Sacred Palace, was instrumental in partially rehabilitating the works of Rosmini. In an article published in L'Osservatore Romano on 16 June 1876, Gatti made clear that Pius IX did not intend the "dimittantur" as amounting to wholesale condemnation.

The controversy continued until 1887, when Pope Leo XIII condemned forty of Rosmini's propositions. Referring to this condemnation, however, the Congregation for the Doctrine of the Faith issued a document in 2001 in which it declared that "the meaning of the propositions, as understood and condemned by the Decree, does not belong to the authentic position of Rosmini."

In 1998 Rosmini was named by Pope John Paul II in the encyclical Fides et Ratio as one of the greater Christian thinkers.

Thought
The most comprehensive view of Rosmini's philosophical standpoint is to be found in his , in which he set forth the conception of a complete encyclopaedia of the human knowable, synthetically conjoined, according to the order of ideas, in a perfectly harmonious whole. Contemplating the position of recent philosophy from John Locke to Georg Hegel, and having his eye directed to the ancient and fundamental problem of the origin, truth and certainty of our ideas, he wrote: "If philosophy is to be restored to love and respect, I think it will be necessary, in part, to return to the teachings of the ancients, and in part to give those teachings the benefit of modern methods" (Theodicy, a. 148). He examined and analysed the fact of human knowledge, and obtained the following results:
that the notion or idea of being or existence in general enters into, and is presupposed by, all our acquired cognitions, so that, without it, they would be impossible
that this idea is essentially objective, inasmuch as what is seen in it is as distinct from and opposed to the mind that sees it as the light is from the eye that looks at it
that it is essentially true, because being and truth are convertible terms, and because in the vision of it the mind cannot err, since error could only be committed by a judgment, and here there is no judgment, but a pure intuition affirming nothing and denying nothing
that by the application of this essentially objective and true idea the human being intellectually perceives, first, the animal body individually conjoined with him, and then, on occasion of the sensations produced in him not by himself, the causes of those sensations, that is, from the action felt he perceives and affirms an agent, a being, and therefore a true thing, that acts on him, and he thus gets at the external world, these are the true primitive judgments, containing
the subsistence of the particular being (subject), and
its essence or species as determined by the quality of the action felt from it (predicate)
that reflection, by separating the essence or species from the subsistence, obtains the full specific idea (universalization), and then from this, by leaving aside some of its elements, the abstract specific idea (abstraction)
that the mind, having reached this stage of development, can proceed to further and further abstracts, including the first principles of reasoning, the principles of the several sciences, complex ideas, groups of ideas, and so on without end
finally, that the same most universal idea of being, this generator and formal element of all acquired cognitions, cannot itself be acquired, but must be innate in us, implanted by God in our nature. Being, as naturally shining to our mind, must therefore be what men call the light of reason. Hence the name Rosmini gives it of ideal being; and this he laid down as the fundamental principle of all philosophy and the supreme criterion of truth and certainty. This he believed to be the teaching of St Augustine, as well as of St Thomas, of whom he was an ardent admirer and defender.

The cause for canonization
On 26 June 2006, Pope Benedict XVI signed a Decree of the heroic virtues, and hence declared Rosmini to be Venerable. On 3 June 2007, Pope Benedict XVI authorized the promulgation of a decree approving Rosmini's beatification. On 18 November 2007 he was beatified in Novara, Italy.

Works
Of his numerous works, of which a collected edition in 17 volumes was issued at Milan (1842–44), supplemented by Opere postume in 5 volumes (Turin, 1859–74), the most important are:

The Principles of Moral Science (1831)
The Restoration of Philosophy in Italy (1836)
The Philosophy of Right (1841–45)
The following have also been translated into English:

'Psychology'' (Anonymous) (1884–88)

References

Further reading

 Includes a biographical sketch and bibliography.

External links
Antonio Rosmini, Lezioni di Maria Scalisi sull'Antropologia in servizio della scienza morale, in https://www.youtube.com/watch?v=pJyGUDrn2DA
 

1797 births
1855 deaths
Founders of Catholic religious communities
Italian philosophers
Italian beatified people
People from Trentino
19th-century Italian Roman Catholic theologians
Beatifications by Pope Benedict XVI
Venerated Catholics by Pope Benedict XVI
Liberal Catholicism
19th-century Italian philosophers